2nd Time Around is a studio album recorded by American R&B group The Spinners, released in October 1970 on Motown's V.I.P. label (their second overall). This is their only album with G. C. Cameron (who replaced Edgar Edwards from the previous album and was replaced by Philippé Wynne on their next album). This is also the group's last album made while they were under contract with Motown Records; by the time of their next album, they had signed at Atlantic Records.

History
The album includes the first of the group's string of 1970s' hits, the Stevie Wonder produced "It's a Shame", which was their first U.S. Pop top-twenty (and third R&B top-ten) hit, as well as most of the group's singles released between 1968–1971 (the exception being the original version of "Message From a Black Man" and their second hit, "We'll Have It Made", which was their last hit – and last single – released while they were under contract with Motown).

Also in 1973, the label released a second version of "It's a Shame"'s B-side, "Together We Can Make Such Sweet Music", which reached #91 on the Billboard Hot 100 Pop charts. The album was also the first of fourteen straight studio albums to make the Billboard 200, barely squeezing in at #199 on the charts (and their first R&B albums charter, entering the Top-fifty at #46).

Track listing

Personnel
 Billy Henderson, Bobby Smith, G.C. Cameron, Henry Fambrough, and Pervis Jackson – vocals
 The Andantes (Jackie Hicks, Marlene Barrow, and Louvain Demps) – backing vocals (some tracks)
 Johnny Bristol, Harvey Fuqua – producer
 Stevie Wonder – producer, drums ("It's a Shame")
 George Gordy – producer
 Robert Gordy – producer
 Allen Story – producer
 Clay McMurray – producer
 Ivy Jo Hunter – producer
 Wade Marcus – arranger
 Paul Riser – arranger
 Willie Shorter – arranger
 The Funk Brothers – instrumentation

Charts

Weekly charts

Singles

References

External links
 

1970 albums
The Spinners (American group) albums
Motown albums
Albums produced by Harvey Fuqua
Albums produced by Johnny Bristol
Albums produced by Stevie Wonder
Albums produced by Robert Gordy
Albums produced by Ivy Jo Hunter
Albums arranged by Wade Marcus
Albums arranged by Paul Riser